The following is a list of centenarians known for reasons other than their longevity. For more lists, see lists of centenarians.

References

+Miscellaneous